Nudaria ranruna is a moth of the subfamily Arctiinae first described by Shōnen Matsumura in 1927. It is found in Taiwan.

References

Nudariina